Brajinder Singh Daved (born 25 January 1953) is a Kenyan field hockey player. He competed at the 1972 Summer Olympics and the 1984 Summer Olympics.

References

External links
 

1953 births
Living people
Kenyan male field hockey players
Olympic field hockey players of Kenya
Field hockey players at the 1972 Summer Olympics
Field hockey players at the 1984 Summer Olympics
Sportspeople from Nairobi
Kenyan people of Indian descent
Kenyan people of Punjabi descent